Walter Lockhart Gordon  (January 27, 1906 – March 21, 1987) was a Canadian accountant, businessman, politician, and writer.

Education
Born in Toronto, he was educated at Upper Canada College and the Royal Military College of Canada in Kingston, Ontario.

Early business career
Upon graduation, he joined the family accounting firm of Clarkson, Gordon and Company, in January 1927. He was a student there for four years, became a chartered accountant in early 1931, and was promoted to partner in 1935.

During World War II, Gordon served in the Bank of Canada and the federal Ministry of Finance. In 1946, he chaired the Royal Commission on Administrative Classifications in the Public Service.

The beginnings of economic nationalism
From 1955 to 1957, Gordon chaired the Royal Commission on Canada's Economic Prospects. The commission's reports, issued in 1956 and 1957, expressed concern about growing foreign ownership in the Canadian economy, particularly in the resource sector, and made recommendations to redress the problem. The themes raised in the reports were revisited by Gordon in his government career.

Political career
In the 1962 federal election, he was elected to the House of Commons of Canada as a Liberal. He was Minister of Finance from 1963 to 1965, during Prime Minister Lester Pearson's first minority government. Gordon's 1965 budget, which included an 11% tax on construction materials and manufacturing equipment, as well as the expansion of social programs, was attacked by the Opposition parties. Gordon persuaded Pearson to call the 1965 federal election and co-chaired the Liberal campaign. When the election failed to return a Liberal majority, Gordon, taking responsibility for giving the prime minister poor advice, resigned from Cabinet and returned to the backbench. In 1967, he returned to Cabinet as  President of the Privy Council from 1967 to 1968. He was noted for his economic nationalism and his support for new social programs.

Gordon disagreed, often sharply, with Pearson over the significant expansion in federal expenditures and the decline of sound financial management in Pearson's second administration, which began in 1965. The long friendship between the two men, which had begun in the mid-1930s, gradually unravelled.

Gordon supported Pierre Trudeau's winning 1968 bid for the Liberal leadership, after Pearson announced his retirement in late 1967. Trudeau, after he became prime minister, invited Gordon to join his Cabinet in April 1968. However, Gordon declined over some misgivings about being able to work successfully with Trudeau and decided not to run again for office in the June 1968 general election.

Returns to business
After leaving politics in 1968, he returned to business. He continued to argue for economic nationalist causes and in 1970, along with Peter C. Newman of the Toronto Star, economist Abraham Rotstein, and University of Toronto professor Mel Watkins, founded the Committee for an Independent Canada. Canadian historian Jack Granatstein argues in Yankee Go Home? that the CIC "helped to create the atmosphere in which Trudeau's government established the Canada Development Corporation in 1971 to 'buy back' Canada."

Later years
Gordon was the Chancellor of York University from 1973 to 1977. According to Dr. Stephen Azzi, Walter Gordon is responsible for "New Nationalism" in Canada. This is the idea of supporting stronger ties with Great Britain, to prevent Canada being absorbed by United States.
He published his political memoirs in 1977. He died in 1987.

Honours and awards

In 1976, he was made a Companion of the Order of Canada.  He was made a Commander of the Order of the British Empire in 1946 for his war services.
In 2009, 1681 Honourable Walter L. Gordon, PC, CC, CBE, FCA, LLD (1906–1987) was added to the wall of honour at the Royal Military College of Canada in Kingston, Ontario.

Archives 
There is a Walter Lockhart Gordon fonds at Library and Archives Canada.

Electoral record

References

Further reading
 Azzi, Stephen. Walter Gordon and the Rise of Canadian Nationalism (McGill-Queen's Press-MQUP, 1999).
 Smith, Denis. Gentle Patriot: A Political Biography of Walter Gordon, Edmonton 1973, Hurtig Publishers.

Writings
 Troubled Canada: The Need for New Domestic Policies, by Walter Gordon, 1961.
 A Choice for Canada: Independence or Colonial Status, by Walter Gordon, 1966.
 Storm Signals: New Economic Policies for Canada, by Walter Gordon, 1975.
 A Political Memoir, by Walter Gordon, Toronto 1977, McClelland & Stewart publishers, .

External links
 

1906 births
1987 deaths
20th-century Canadian civil servants
Canadian memoirists
Canadian Ministers of Finance
Canadian nationalists
Canadian non-fiction writers
Chancellors of York University
Companions of the Order of Canada
Liberal Party of Canada MPs
Members of the House of Commons of Canada from Ontario
Members of the King's Privy Council for Canada
Upper Canada College alumni
Royal Military College of Canada alumni
Canadian accountants
Canadian Commanders of the Order of the British Empire
20th-century memoirists